The collared antshrike (Thamnophilus bernardi) is a species of bird in the family Thamnophilidae.
It is found in Ecuador and Peru.
Its natural habitats are subtropical or tropical dry forests, subtropical or tropical dry shrubland, and subtropical or tropical moist shrubland.

Taxonomy
The collared antshrike was described by the French naturalist René Lesson in 1844 and given the binomial name Thamnophilus bernardi (the genus was misspelled as Tamnophilus) with the type locality of Guayaquil in Ecuador. The specific epithet honours Captain Bernard, a French mariner and collector from Bordeaux. The collared antshrike was subsequently placed in the genus Sakesphorus. A molecular phylogenetic study published in 2007 found that Sakesphorus was polyphyletic and that three species including the collared antshrike were embedded within a clade containing members of Thamnophilus. The collared antshrike was therefore moved back to its original genus.

See also
 Maranon antshrike - A closely related species
 Fauna of Peru

References

External links
Image at ADW

collared antshrike
Birds of Ecuador
Birds of Peru
Birds of the Tumbes-Chocó-Magdalena
collared antshrike
Taxa named by René Lesson
Taxonomy articles created by Polbot